Elections to Sefton Metropolitan Borough Council were held on 4 May 2006. One third of the council was up for election and the council stayed under no overall control.

After the election, the composition of the council was:
Liberal Democrat 26
Labour 21
Conservative 19

Election result

Ward results

References

2006 English local elections
2006
2000s in Merseyside